The 38th Junior World Luge Championships took place under the auspices of the International Luge Federation in Bludenz, Austria from 14 to 15 January 2023.

Schedule
Five events were held.

All times are local (UTC+1).

Medalists

Medal table

References

Junior World Luge Championships
Junior World Luge Championships
Junior World Luge Championships
Luge
Luge in Austria
International sports competitions hosted by Austria
Junior World Luge Championships